Route 215 is a highway in southern Missouri. Its northern terminus is at Route 39 south of Stockton; its southern terminus is at U.S. Route 65 between Buffalo and Springfield. Except for a short section which overlaps Route 13, it is a two-lane highway its entire length. It was originally a set of supplemental routes.

Route description
Two miles west (at Umber View Heights), the highway crosses Stockton Lake and enters Stockton State Park. Shortly before reaching Bona, it crosses another arm of Stockton Lake, and at Bona is an intersection with Route 245. East of Bona, it crosses yet another arm of Stockton Lake, then begins a  concurrency with Route 123. At Eudora, the concurrency ends.

The highway continues east to US 65 where the highway ends.

Major intersections

Related route

Route 215 Spur is a former alignment of Route 215 in Polk County, Missouri.

References

215
Transportation in Cedar County, Missouri
Transportation in Dade County, Missouri
Transportation in Polk County, Missouri
Transportation in Dallas County, Missouri